Ambulyx pseudoregia is a species of moth of the  family Sphingidae. It is known from China (Sichuan).

References

Ambulyx
Moths described in 2006
Moths of Asia